Ichneutica dundastica is a moth of the family Noctuidae. This species is endemic to New Zealand. As at 2019 this species has only been found near the Dundas Hut in the Tararua Range near Wellington. It inhabits alpine shrubland and is attracted to light. The life history of this species is unknown as are the host species of its larvae however adults are on the wing from late November to early December. The female of the species is larger and more conspicuous than the male.

Taxonomy 
This species was described by Robert Hoare in 2019. The male holotype was collected at Dundas Hut in the Tararua Range in December by J. S. Dugdale. The holotype specimen is held in the New Zealand Arthropod Collection. This species is named in honour of its type locality Dundas Hut.

Description 
The female of this species is more conspicuous in appearance in comparison to the undistinguished appearance of the male of the species. Along with the restrictive range of this species, the male can be distinguished from similar species as the pectinations on its antennae are very long. The female can be distinguished from similar species as it is large in size and has distinctive colouration and markings on its forewings. The male has a wingspan of between 38.5 and 42 mm whereas the female has a wingspan of between 39.5 and 45 mm.

Distribution 
This species has only been collected in the Tararua Range.

Habitat 
This species inhabits alpine shrubland.

Behaviour 
Adults of this species are attracted to light. As at 2019 adults are only current known to be on the wing between late November and early December. However more sampling needs to be undertaken to confirm the months in which adults of this species are active.

Life history and hosts 
The life history of this species is unknown as are the host species of its larvae.

References

Moths described in 2019
Moths of New Zealand
 Noctuinae
Endemic fauna of New Zealand
Taxa named by Robert Hoare
Endemic moths of New Zealand